Charles Mathers (second ¼ 1860 – death unknown) was an English rugby union footballer who played in the 1880s. He played at representative level for British Isles and Yorkshire, and at club level for Bramley, as a forward. Prior to Tuesday 2 June 1896, Bramley were a rugby union club.

Background
Charles Mathers' birth was registered in Hunslet, West Riding of Yorkshire, England.

Playing career

International honours
Charlie Mathers won cap(s) for British Isles while at Bramley on the 1888 British Lions tour to New Zealand and Australia.

Change of code
When Bramley converted from the rugby union code to the Northern Union code on Tuesday 2 June 1896, Charlie Mathers  would have been approximately 36 years of age. Consequently, he may have been both a rugby union and Northern Union footballer for Bramley.

References

External links
Search for "Mathers" at espn.co.uk (1888 British Isles tourists statistics missing (31 December 2017))
Statistics at lionsrugby.com
Football – British Football Team’s Visit To New Zealand.
The Return Of The English Team To Their Native Land
Lions' tragic history uncovered
Football. A team of British Rugby footballers visited the colonies in April

1860 births
British & Irish Lions rugby union players from England
English rugby union players
Yorkshire County RFU players
People from Hunslet
Place of death unknown
Rugby union forwards
Bramley RLFC players
Year of death unknown
Rugby union players from Leeds